Locus Solus is an album of improvisations by John Zorn and other musicians. Originally released as a double vinyl album on Rift records in 1983 it was re-released as a CD with additional tracks on Eva/Wave in 1990 and on Zorn's Tzadik Records label in 1997.

Reception

The AllMusic review by Joslyn Layne awarded the album 3 stars, stating: "This captures over an hour's worth of John Zorn's search for the improvised song form.... Overall, an album of short, angular, experimental energy tracks." 

The Penguin Guide to Jazz observed "This is one of the sacred texts of '80s New York improv, a fierce scrabbly set of associations that draw heavily on the power trio aesthetic of bands like Husker Dü... It's impressively compact but sometime rather abrupt".

Track listing 

Note: (16,18,20,22) are extra tracks not available on the LP pressing.

Personnel 
John Zorn – alto and soprano saxophones, game calls, Bb Clarinet
Christian Marclay – turntables (tracks 1–9)
Peter Blegvad – vocals (tracks 1–9)
Arto Lindsay – guitar, vocals (tracks 10–22)
Anton Fier – drums (tracks 10–15)
M. E. Miller – drums (tracks 16–22, 31–38)
Ikue Mori – drums (tracks 23–30)
Wayne Horvitz – keyboards (tracks 23–30)
Whiz Kid – turntables (tracks 31–38)

References

John Zorn albums
Tzadik Records albums
1983 albums
Albums produced by John Zorn